La Rinconada is a town in the Peruvian Andes near a gold mine. Between 2001 and 2009, the population was estimated by National Geographic to have increased to 30,000 people from just a small gold prospector camp because the price of gold rose 235% over that period, although this number has not been reflected by the 2007 or 2017 censuses.

Location 
La Rinconada is a populated center, within the jurisdiction of Ananea District, in San Antonio de Putina Province, Puno Department, Peru. La Rinconada is located in the Janca region, according to the classification of Pulgar Vidal, thus being the highest permanent town in the world. According to the May 2003 issue of National Geographic magazine, La Rinconada is 5,100 meters above sea level.

Etymology
"La Rinconada" means "The Corner" in Spanish.

Geography

Topography
The town is in the Ananea District, San Antonio de Putina Province.

Climate 
High in the Andes, La Rinconada has an alpine tundra climate (ET, according to the Köppen climate classification), with no month having mean temperatures even close to the  threshold that would permit tree growth and a subtropical highland classification for the city. Far above the tree line, La Rinconada is unique in its high elevation and population, with the highest city of comparable population (Nagqu) being over  closer to sea level.

Owing to the extreme elevation of the town, climatic conditions more closely resemble that of the west coast of Greenland than somewhere only 14° from the equator. The town has rainy summers and dry winters with a large diurnal variation seeing cool to cold days and freezing night time temperatures throughout the year, with snowfalls common.

Population 
According to a report by National Geographic, the 235% increase in the price of gold between 2001 and 2009 caused a strong growth in the local population, which reached 30,000 inhabitants in 2009. However, these numbers could be overestimated, since the 2007 National Census indicated the population of the Ananea District (which, to a large extent, is found in the La Rinconada settlement) was 20,572 people (16,907 classified as urban), and the 2017 National Census recorded 12,615 people (11,307 classified as urban). By comparison, the population of the Ananea District in 1981 was 2,707 people.

Economy
The economy is mainly based on the production of gold from nearby gold mines, many artisanal.

Many miners work at the gold mine owned by Corporación Ananea. Under the cachorreo system they work for 30 days without payment and for one day they are allowed to work for themselves. At this day of the month, the miners are allowed to take with them as much ore as they can carry on their shoulders. Whether the ore contains any gold or not is a matter of luck. Pocketing of nuggets or promising chunks of rich ore is tolerated. This system sometimes ends with miners not being compensated for their work. While women are banned from working directly in the mines, pallaqueras, women who work on the outside of the mines, sift through what has been discarded hoping to find something of value.

Inca Manco Cápac International Airport is the nearest commercial airport; it is located in Juliaca.

Environmental issues
The town lacks plumbing and sanitation systems. Hypoxia is a significant health problem due to the low air pressure at such high altitude. There is also significant contamination by mercury, due to the mining practices. Local miners refine the ore by grinding and treating it with mercury and pressing the mass through a cloth to filter it. The resulting amalgam is heated, to remove the mercury.

References

External links

 Documentary film shown on www.dev.tv

Populated places in the Puno Region